The Panzer Division "Kempf" (also  East Prussia Panzer Formation (de: Panzerverband Ostpreußen) was an ad hoc combined arms formation consisting of regular German Army personnel and SS. It was created for operations out of East Prussia during the Invasion of Poland in 1939. The formation was generally called Panzer Division "Kempf" after General der Panzertruppe Werner Kempf assumed command, though it was only about half the strength of the other Panzer Divisions of the time.

The division participated in the Battle of Mława. The SS components of the division committed war crimes against Polish Jews (Massacre in Krasnosielc ) on September 6, 1939, and against the Polish soldiers, civilians, including Polish Jews in the Massacre in Zakroczym on September 28, 1939.

See also
List of German divisions in World War II
List of Waffen-SS divisions
List of SS personnel

References

Bibliography

Military units and formations of the Waffen-SS
German panzer divisions
Military units and formations established in 1939
Ad hoc units and formations
Military units and formations disestablished in 1939